Episcopal Church of the Ascension, or variants thereof, may refer to:

United States

California
 Episcopal Church of the Ascension (Sierra Madre, California)

Delaware
 Church of the Ascension (Claymont, Delaware), part of the New Castle Parish of the Episcopal Diocese of Delaware

Florida
 Church of the Ascension (Clearwater, Florida), part of the Episcopal Diocese of Southwest Florida

Illinois
 Church of the Ascension, Chicago, a parish in the Episcopal Diocese of Chicago

Kentucky
 Church of the Ascension (Frankfort, Kentucky), part of the Episcopal Diocese of Lexington, Kentucky

New York
 Church of the Ascension (New York) in Greenwich Village, New York City, part of the Episcopal Diocese of New York

Pennsylvania 
 Church of the Ascension (Pittsburgh) in Pittsburgh, Pennsylvania, part of the Episcopal Diocese of Pittsburgh

Tennessee
 Episcopal Church of the Ascension (Tennessee) in Bearden, Knoxville, part of the Episcopal Diocese of East Tennessee

Washington, D.C.
 Church of the Ascension and St Agnes (Washington D.C.), part of the Episcopal Diocese of Washington.

See also
 Church of the Ascension (disambiguation)